Valea Lupului River may refer to the following rivers in Romania:
 Valea Lupului, a tributary of the Argeș in Argeș County
 Valea Lupului, a tributary of the Bistra in Caraș-Severin County
 Valea Lupului, a tributary of the Bozani in Bihor County
 Valea Lupului, a tributary of the Cibin in Sibiu County
 Valea Lupului, a tributary of the Holbav in Brașov County
 Valea Lupului, a tributary of the Iad in Bihor County
 Valea Lupului, a tributary of the Negri in Caraș-Severin County
 Valea Lupului, a tributary of the Râușor in Argeș County